A coastal warning display tower, also known as a storm warning tower, is a type of signal station in the form of skeletal towers designed to provide warnings of hazardous wind conditions in coastal areas.  The towers were developed in 1898 on the orders of President William McKinley. Through a system of flags, the towers can indicate not only wind-related warnings, but also major aspects of the local daily weather forecast.

A single red pennant was shown from the top of the tower as a small craft advisory; for a gale warning, two such pennants were used.  Two square flags, red with a black square at center, indicate an approaching hurricane or winds >73 MPH. One such flag warns of storm-force winds or an approaching tropical storm.

Three lights, two red and one white, carry the signal at night.  Red over white indicates a small craft advisory, white over red indicates a gale warning, red over red indicates a storm warning.  All three lights together, red-white-red, warns of a hurricane or other hurricane-force wind event.

Other flags can be used to indicate the direction of winds during a tropical storm or storm warning, to indicate the temperature change relative to the previous day, to warn of an approaching cold front, and to show the forecast coverage of precipitation (widespread fair weather, scattered precipitation, or widespread precipitation).

The system of towers is widely considered unnecessary today due to the prevalence of NOAA Weather Radio All Hazards, and few original towers survive. However, the system of using flags to indicate warnings related to strong winds in coastal areas remains in use by the U.S. Coast Guard, using ordinary flagpoles in lieu of the larger, more expensive, and more complex towers. At least one complete CWD tower, with all of its original equipment, remains in full operation in the city of Manteo, North Carolina.

Remaining towers

 Manteo, North Carolina, operated by the North Carolina Maritime Museum
 Portsmouth, New Hampshire
 Providence, Rhode Island
 New Haven, Connecticut
 Southport, North Carolina
 Hammond, Oregon
 Oswego, New York, at Fort Ontario State Historic Site
 Washington, North Carolina, operated by the City of Washington

See also
 Weather beacon

External links

National Weather Service entry

Weather warnings and advisories
Navigational aids